Abkhazia is a region in the Caucasus that is under the effective control of the partially recognised self-declared Republic of Abkhazia. The de jure majority internationally recognized Autonomous Republic of Abkhazia claims to be its legitimate government.

Republic of Abkhazia 

The flag of the Republic of Abkhazia was created in 1991 by Valeri Gamgia. It was officially adopted on 23 July 1992.
The design of the red canton is based on the banner of the medieval Kingdom of Abkhazia. The open right hand means "Hello to friends! Stop to Enemies!". The seven stars in the canton have since been reinterpreted to correspond to the seven historical regions of the country: Sadzen, Bzyp, Gumaa, Abzhywa, Samurzaqan, Dal-Tsabal and Pskhuy-Aibga.

Seven is a number sacred to the Abkhaz and the green and white stripes represent the tolerance that allows Christianity and Islam to coexist.

Autonomous Republic of Abkhazia 
As no official flag has been adopted for use by the Autonomous Republic of Abkhazia, the flag of Georgia is used by the Government of Autonomous Republic of Abkhazia.

A flag has been proposed by the Georgian State Council of Heraldry for the region that combines the flag of Georgia with green and white stripes of the Abkazhian flag.

Historical flags

Mountainous Republic of the Northern Caucasus 
The Mountainous Republic of the Northern Caucasus was a state that declared independence in 1917 from both the Russian Soviet Federative Socialist Republic and White Russian forces during the Russian Civil War. It claimed Abkhazia as its territory, but Abkhazia was also claimed and occupied by the Democratic Republic of Georgia. The purported flag of the Mountain Republic contains several elements that would later be included in the Abkhazian flag, including seven green and white horizontal stripes and a canton with seven stars. In the North Caucasian flag, the seven stars and stripes represented the regions of Dagestan, Chechen-Ingushia, Ossetia, Abkhazia, Karbadia, Adygea, and Karachay-Balkaria.

Socialist Soviet Republic of Abkhazia 
The flag of the SSR Abkhazia was adopted in 1925 when the SSR Abkhazia ratified its constitution. It was used until 1931, when the SSR Abkhazia was transformed into the Abkhaz ASSR with a different flag.

Abkhaz Autonomous Soviet Socialist Republic 
The flag of the Abkhaz ASSR was introduced in 1978 and used until the collapse of the Soviet Union in 1991. The previous flag used between 1931 and 1978 was identical to the flag of the Georgian SSR, and in 1978 the name of the Abkhaz ASSR was added written in the Abkhaz language and script.

Flag on stamps

See also 
 Emblem of Abkhazia
 Coat of arms of the Socialist Soviet Republic of Abkhazia
 Flag of the Abkhaz Autonomous Soviet Socialist Republic

References

External links 

 Flag of Abkhazia at FOTW
 

National flags
Flag
Flags of states with limited recognition
Flag of the Socialist Soviet Republic
Flags introduced in 1992
Abkhazia